Emmanuel Félémou (24 December 1960 – 1 March 2021) was a Guinean prelate of the Roman Catholic Church.

Biography
Born in Kolouma, Félémou was ordained to the priesthood in 1989. He was appointed bishop of Kankan in 2007, serving until his death in 2021.

On 1 March 2021, Félémou died from COVID-19 in Conakry during the COVID-19 pandemic in Guinea.

References

1960 births
2021 deaths
21st-century Roman Catholic bishops in Guinea
Deaths from the COVID-19 pandemic in Guinea
Roman Catholic bishops of Kankan